The Poetry of Ådalen (Swedish: Ådalens poesi) is a 1947 Swedish drama film directed by Ivar Johansson and starring Adolf Jahr, Wilma Malmlöf and Nine-Christine Jönsson. It was shot at the Centrumateljéerna Studios in Stockholm. The film's sets were designed by the art director Bibi Lindström. It is a remake of the 1928 silent film of the same title.

Cast
 Adolf Jahr as 	Zackris Månsson
 Wilma Malmlöf as 	Mrs. Månsson
 Nine-Christine Jönsson as 	Imbär
 Sten Lindgren as 	Kerstorps-farmer
 Naima Wifstrand as 	Kersti
 Kenne Fant as 	Olle 
 Hans Järrsten as 	Olle as a child
 Ingrid Strandberg as Imbär as a child
 Erik Sundqvist as 	Pelle Molin
 Per-Axel Arosenius as 	Lindskog
 Alf Östlund as 	Ferry-boat man
 Torgny Anderberg as 	Per-Matts 
 Eric Laurent as Vicar 
 Georg Skarstedt as Manfred 
 Birger Åsander as 	Jonas Bode

References

Bibliography 
 Qvist, Per Olov & von Bagh, Peter. Guide to the Cinema of Sweden and Finland. Greenwood Publishing Group, 2000.

External links 
 

1947 films
Swedish drama films
1947 drama films
1940s Swedish-language films
Films directed by Ivar Johansson
Swedish black-and-white films
Remakes of Swedish films
1940s Swedish films